Lucus Pisaurensis is a sacred grove or lucus of ancient Pisaureum, modern Pesaro in Italy. It is just outside the coastal comune of Pesaro, between the Colle della Salute and the Collina in Santa Veneranda. It is in the Pesaro e Urbino Province of Marche, a pre-Imperium Romanum region of the Sabines and Latins peoples.

Discovery

The eighteenth-century Italian aristocrat Annibale degli Abati Olivieri discovered the grove in 1737. He reported this in a manuscript published in 1738, Pisaurensia Marmora, ("Marble of Pesaro-Umbria"), a manuscript written by 18th Century Italian aristocrat Annibale degli Abbati Olivieri Giordani, was published in 1738. Olivieri said that he found the grove in a field by the Chiostro di Santo Gaetano dei Conti. He called the site Lucus Pisaurensis (Sacred Grove of Pesaro) and gave a brief description of his findings.  Olivieri wrote that he planned to publish a future work called De Luco Sacred Veterum Pisaurensium ("The Sacred Grove of Ancient Pisaurensis"), once excavations were completed.  This was never published and interest in the lucus disappeared after Oliviera's death.

Oliveri unearthed in the field fourteen votive stones or cippi, carved of sandstone with Sabine inscriptions in Umbrian-Estrucan; a number of terracotta and sandstone artifacts; clay & copper coin; and a small bronze object inscribed Libra. The votives were inscribed with names of various Sabini-Etruscan gods:  Salute, Fide, Lucina, Marica, Feronia, Juno Regina; as well as the later Roman Gods: Iunos, Diana and Mater Matuta.

He also found a terracotta borderline marker, inscribed " δ Δ δ  luci coiirii CI  LX ".  Luci Coiiri means 'Coerian Grove' and the Roman numerals are thought to reference land measurements.

Olivieri found other artifacts on his estate, all of which are housed in the Biblioteca Oliveriana and Museo Oliveriano, a museum and library in Pesaro founded by him. Among these are bronze and clay coinage, carved sandstone stela from 7th C. B.C. depicting naumachia (mock naval battles) and a bronze Tabula Fabrorum with a relief of the Etruscan goddess Menrva (found at Palazzo Barignani).

21st century

The grove was rediscovered and archaeological interest in the site renewed during excavations in the 21st century.<ref>Gabriele Stroppa, "First to Pisauro Tombstone, New Research in Fragments, n. 12, Pesaro 2008</ref> It has been suggested that the site was a meeting place for different groups of people.

See also
 :it:Lucus Pisaurensis: article on the site on the Italian Wikipedia
 :it:Annibale degli Abati Olivieri: article on Olivieri on the Italian Wikipedia

References

Further reading
 "Il lucus Pisaurensis e la romanizzazione dell'Ager Gallicus", by Filippo Coarelli, in Christer Bruun (ed), The Roman Middle Republic: Politics, Religion, and Historiography c.400-133 BC: papers from a conference at the Institutum Romanum Finlandiae'', Institutum Romanum Finlandiae, Rome (2000) (ISBN 952-5323-00-5)

Sacred groves
Archaeological sites in Italy